The 1955 Australian Grand Prix was a motor race held at the Port Wakefield Circuit in South Australia on 10 October 1955. The race, which had 22 starters, was held over 80 laps of the 2.09 km (1.3 mi) circuit. It was open to Formula Libre cars of unlimited capacity. The race was promoted by Brooklyn Speedway (SA) Ltd. and was organised by the Sporting Car Club of SA Inc.

It was the twentieth Australian Grand Prix and the first to be held on a purpose built motor racing circuit after the previous 19 were held on closed streets or country roads, or on airfields modified for the purpose. Future World Champion Jack Brabham won his first Australian Grand Prix in a streamlined Cooper-Bristol that Brabham, having recently joined the Cooper team, had assembled himself and sent to Australia. It was the first time a rear-engined car had won the AGP, although this was seen as an upset win and a rear-engined car would not win again until 1960.

Classification 

Results as follows.

Notes 
 Pole position: Reg Hunt
Fastest lap: Jack Brabham/Reg Hunt - 1'03
 Number of starters: 22

References

External links
 Image of Jack Brabham (Cooper Bristol) contesting the 1955 Australian Grand Prix, www.jack-brabham-engines.com via web.archive.org
 Images from Port Wakefield, 1955, aussieroadracing.homestead.com via web.archive.org

Grand Prix
Australian Grand Prix
Australian Grand Prix